Leucoptera autograpta is a moth in the family Lyonetiidae that is endemic to South Africa.

References

Leucoptera (moth)
Moths described in 1918
Endemic moths of South Africa